Littrow may refer to:

Joseph Johann von Littrow (1781-1840), Austrian astronomer
 Littrow projection, a map projection invented by Joseph Johann Littrow, also called the Weir Azimuth diagram
 Littrow (crater), a lunar crater named for astronomer Joseph Johann von Littrow
 Taurus–Littrow, a valley on the Moon named after the Littrow crater and the Taurus mountain range
Karl L. Littrow, Austrian astronomer, son of Joseph Johann Littrow
Auguste von Littrow, German-Austrian author and women's movement leader
Heinrich von Littrow, Austrian cartographer and writer
 Otto von Littrow (1843-1864), son of Karl and Auguste von Littrow
 Littrow angle
 Littrow prism, an optical device developed by Joseph Johann von Littrow used with lasers and in spectroscopy
Lea von Littrow (1860-1925), Austrian painter, daughter of Heinrich von Littrow

German-language surnames